Otto of Lorraine may refer to:
Otto, Duke of Lorraine (died 944), reigned 940–944
Otto, Duke of Lower Lorraine (c. 970–1012), reigned 991–1012